Marise Ann Millicent Chamberlain  (born 5 December 1935) is a former New Zealand middle-distance runner. She is the only New Zealand woman to win an Olympic medal in  track athletics (Lorraine Moller won a medal in the marathon). She set world records over 440 yards, 400 metres and 1 mile.

At the 1962 British Empire and Commonwealth Games in Perth, Western Australia, she won a silver medal over 880 yards, behind Australian Dixie Willis. Two years later, at the Summer Olympics in Tokyo, she won the bronze medal behind Ann Packer (gold) and Maryvonne Dupureur (silver), the top five runners beating the old Olympic record time set by Dupureur in the semifinals.

At the 1966 British Empire and Commonwealth Games in Kingston, Jamaica Chamberlain stumbled just before the finish line when leading in the 880 yds final and missed out on a medal.

In the 2003 Queen's Birthday Honours, Chamberlain was appointed a Member of the New Zealand Order of Merit, for services to athletics.

Chamberlain was inducted into the New Zealand Sports Hall of Fame in 1995.

Honorific eponym
Chamberlain Place, in the Hamilton suburb of Chartwell, is named in Chamberlain's honour.

References

External links 

 
 Page with Photo at Sporting Heroes

1935 births
Living people
Athletes (track and field) at the 1964 Summer Olympics
Athletes (track and field) at the 1958 British Empire and Commonwealth Games
Athletes (track and field) at the 1962 British Empire and Commonwealth Games
Athletes (track and field) at the 1966 British Empire and Commonwealth Games
New Zealand female middle-distance runners
Olympic athletes of New Zealand
Olympic bronze medalists for New Zealand
Athletes from Christchurch
Commonwealth Games silver medallists for New Zealand
World record setters in athletics (track and field)
Commonwealth Games medallists in athletics
Members of the New Zealand Order of Merit
Medalists at the 1964 Summer Olympics
Olympic bronze medalists in athletics (track and field)
Medallists at the 1962 British Empire and Commonwealth Games